Carl Petersen (1 May 1894 – 21 May 1984) was a Danish politician, representing the Social Democratic Party in Parliament (Folketinget). He served as Minister for Public Works in 1945, Traffic Minister from 1947 to 1950 and again from 1953 to 1955, Minister for Agriculture in 1950, and Interior Minister of Denmark from 30 August 1955 to 28 May 1957.

References
Skou, Kaare, R. (2005). Dansk politik A-Å . Aschehoug, pp. 537–538. .

1894 births
1984 deaths
Danish Interior Ministers
Members of the Folketing
Agriculture ministers of Denmark
Transport ministers of Denmark